An admissions or application essay, sometimes also called a personal statement or a statement of purpose, is an essay or other written statement written by an applicant, often a prospective student applying to some college, university, or graduate school. The application essay is a common part of the university and college admissions process.

Some applications may require one or more essays to be completed, while others make essays optional or supplementary. Essay topics range from very specific to open-ended.

United States
The Common Application, used for undergraduate admissions by many American colleges and universities, requires a general admissions essay, in addition to any supplemental admissions essays required by member institutions. The Common Application offers students six admissions essay prompts from which to choose. According to Uni in the USA, the Common Application essay is intended as a chance to describe "things that are unique, interesting and informative about yourself".

The University of Chicago is known for its unusual essay prompts in its undergraduate admissions application, including "What would you do with a foot-and-a-half-tall jar of mustard"?

United Kingdom
A personal statement is part of an application sent to UCAS by a prospective student at a UK university. In a personal statement, the student writes about what they hope to achieve in a UK university course, what they hope to do after the course and why they are applying to this particular university.

See also 
 
 College application

References 

University and college admissions